The 1927 Philadelphia mayoral election saw Republican nominee Harry Arista Mackey defeat former Republican mayor J. Hampton Moore, who was running on the Citizens'  party line.

Results

References

1927
Philadelphia
1927 Pennsylvania elections
1920s in Philadelphia